Shankar Melkote is an Indian comedian, supporting actor who appears in Telugu films and CEO of a marketing company in Hyderabad. He started his film career with Jandhyala's Srivariki Premalekha and went on to appear in 180 films. He is one of the speakers and writers at the Hyderabad Literary Festival. Melkote received the 17th Yudhvir Memorial Award in 2008 for outstanding contribution. He is  the father-in-law of M.V.Sridhar, well noted Hyderabad ranji player and Former BCCI General Manager.

Filmography

 Srivariki Premalekha (1984)
 Karu Diddina Kapuram (1986)
 Paila Pacheesu (1989)
 Ashwini (1991)
 Nuvve Kavali (2000)
 Anandam (2001)
 Akasa Veedhilo (2001)
 Nuvvu Naaku Nachav (2001)
 Ishtam (2001)
 Santosham (2002)
 Manmadhudu (2002)
 Oka Raju Oka Rani (2003)
 Oka Radha Iddaru Krishnula Pelli (2003)
 Nenu (2004)
 Dost (2004)
 Anand (2004)
 Thoda Tum Badlo Thoda Hum (Hindi, 2004)
 Anandamanandamaye (2004)
 Balu ABCDEFG (2005)
 Modati Cinema (2005)
Party (2006)
 Desamuduru (2007)
 Aadavari Matalaku Arthale Verule (2007)
 Veduka (2007)
 Gopi – Goda Meeda Pilli(2007)
 Bahumati (2007)
 Lakshyam (2007)
 Athidhi (2007)
 Anasuya (2007)
 Yogi (2007)
 Swagatam (2008)
 John Appa Rao 40 Plus (2008)
 Blade Babji (2008)
 Anthu Inthu Preethi Banthu (Kannada, 2008)
 Dongala Bandi (2008)
 Malli Malli (2009)
 Punnami Naagu (2009)
 Current (2009)
 Bumper Offer (2009)
 Sneha Geetham (2010)
 Broker (2010)
 Pappu (2010)
 Nannavanu (2010)
 Udatha Udatha Ooch (2010)
 Payanam (2011)
 Teen Maar (2011)
 Dookudu (2011)
 Pilla Zamindar (2011)
 Vara Prasad And Potti Prasad (2011)
Shaitan (2011)
 Dhoni (2012)
 Endhukante Premanta (2012)
 Sudigadu (2012)
 Bunny n Cherry (2013)
 Mantra 2 (2013)
 Manam (2014)
 Power (2014)
 Ninnindale (Kannada, 2014)
 Karthikeya (2014)
 Noothi Lo Kappalu (2015)
 O Manasa (2015)
 Cinema Choopistha Mava (2015)
 Akhil (2015)
 Kerintha (2015)
 Supreme (2016)
 Manamantha (2016)
 Head Constable Venkatramaiah (2017)
 Hyderabad Love Story (2018)
 Aravinda Sametha Veera Raghava (2018)
Silly Fellows (2018)
FCUK: Father Chitti Umaa Kaarthik (2021)

References

External links
 https://www.filmcentro.com/profile/melkote-biography

Telugu comedians
Telugu male actors
Living people
Place of birth missing (living people)
1950 births
Indian male film actors
21st-century Indian male actors
Male actors in Telugu cinema